The following is a list of notable deaths in July 1990.

Entries for each day are listed alphabetically by surname. A typical entry lists information in the following sequence:
 Name, age, country of citizenship at birth, subsequent country of citizenship (if applicable), reason for notability, cause of death (if known), and reference.

July 1990

1
Pat Field, 79, Australian politician, suicide.
Paul Gondjout, 78, Gabonese politician.
Lorrie Hunter, 90, New Zealand politician.
Anna Palk, 48, English actress, cancer.
Eric M. Rogers, 87, British physicist.
Jurriaan Schrofer, 64, Dutch artist.
Ivan Serov, 84, Russian intelligence officer, head of the KGB (1954–1958).
Willem Winkelman, 102, Dutch Olympic track and field athlete (1908).

2
Silvina Bullrich, 74, Argentine novelist, lung cancer.
Bert Connelly, 81, Canadian ice hockey player.
Ludwig Franz, 67, German politician.
Marion Rice Hart, 98, American athlete.
Snooky Lanson, 76, American singer and television personality.
Mildred Scott Olmsted, 99, American peace activist.

3
Armand Apell, 85, French boxer.
Bodheswaran, 88, Indian poet.
Maurice Girodias, 71, French publisher, heart attack.
Potsy Jones, 80, American football player.
Vic Olsson, 86, New Zealand rower.

4
Phil Boggs, 40, American Olympic diver (1976), lymphoma.
Olive Ann Burns, 65, American novelist, heart failure.
Beverly Grant, 53, American actress, cancer.
Marshall Hall, 79, American mathematician.
Sweeney Schriner, 78, Russian-born Canadian ice hockey player.
Willi Soya, 54, German footballer.
Nathaniel Wyeth, 78, American engineer and inventor.

5
Edith Bülbring, 86, German-English physiologist.
Tom Curran, 79, American Olympic rower (1936).
Eugene Guth, 84, Austrian-American physicist.
Thistle Yolette Harris, 87, Australian botanist.
Hellmut Wilhelm, 84, German-American Sinologist.

6
William R. Higgins, 45, American colonel, torture murder. (death declared on this date).
Alfred Maasik, 93, Russian-American runner.
Georg Schmidt, 63, Austrian football manager.
Angel Zamarripa, 77, Mexican artist, kidney failure.

7
Don Bessent, 59, American baseball player, alcohol poisoning.
Cazuza, 32, Brazilian musician, AIDS.
Bill Cullen, 70, American television personality (I've Got a Secret), lung cancer.
Hugo Enomiya-Lassalle, 91, German interfaith priest.
Pu Laldenga, 63, Indian politician, lung cancer.
Tommy Pool, 55, American Olympic sport shooter (1964).

8
Joe Appiah, 71, Ghanaian lawyer, politician and statesman.
Richard Barry Bernstein, 66, American physical chemist, heart attack.
Ivan Black, 77, Australian politician.
R. R. M. Carpenter, Jr., 74, American baseball executive, cancer.
Amélia Rey Colaço, 92, Portuguese actor.
Howard Duff, 76, American actor, heart attack.
Hans Faverey, 56, Dutch poet.
John Galbally, 79, Australian politician, Alzheimer's disease.
Malcolm Hilton, 61, English cricketer.
Robert Murzeau, 81, French actor.
Aage Stentoft, 76, Danish composer.
George Edward Wheeler, 75, American Olympic gymnast (1936).
David Widder, 92, American mathematician.

9
Hélène Boschi, 72, Swiss-French pianist.
René Chanas, 76, French film director, screenwriter, and film producer.
Sonny Dunham, 78, American trumpeter, cancer.
Hertha Feist, 94, German expressionist dancer and choreographer.
Vernon Simeon Plemion Grant, 88, American illustrator.
Maire Gullichsen, 83, Finnish art collector.
Ragnar Olsen, 76, Norwegian Olympic racewalker (1952).
Horst Rittel, 59, German design theorist.
Eric M. Warburg, 90, German banker.
Friedrich Wegener, 83, German pathologist.

10
Alain Chapel, 52, French chef, stroke.
Vidya Dhar Mahajan, 77, Indian historian and political scientist.
Donald McGavran, 92, Indian-American missiologist.
Sergei Rudenko, 85, Soviet general.
Alfred Ryan, 86, Australian footballer and cricket player.

11
Ignacio Aguirre, 89, Mexican painter and engraver.
Steve Rabinovitch, 47, Canadian Olympic swimmer (1960).
Earl Stewart, 68, American golfer.
George Watts, 75, American football player.
Sun Yu, 90, Chinese film director.

12
Bill Burrud, 65, American child actor and television host, heart attack.
Yang Chin-hu, 91, Taiwanese politician.
Savkuz Dzarasov, 60, Soviet wrestler and Olympic medalist.
Joan Whitney Kramer, 76, American musician, Alzheimer's disease.
Paul Reps, 94, American poet.
João Saldanha, 73, Brazilian football coach.

13
Alaattin Baydar, 88-89, Turkish footballer.
George L. Mabry Jr., 72, American general, prostate cancer.
Lois Moran, 81, American actress, cancer.
Laura Perls, 84, German psychologist.

14
Ralph Humphrey, 58, American painter.
Philip Leacock, 72, English filmmaker.
Diego Ordóñez, 86, Spanish Olympic sprinter (1920, 1924, 1928).
Walter Sedlmayr, 64, German actor, murdered.

15
Oleg Kagan, 43, Soviet violinist, cancer.
Poul Larsen, 73, Danish canoeist and Olympian.
Alison Leggatt, 86, English actress.
Margaret Lockwood, 73, English actress, cirrhosis.
Alexandre Pawlisiak, 77, French racing cyclist.
Omar Abu Risha, 80, Syrian diplomat and poet.
Enn Roos, 81, Soviet sculptor.
Trouble T Roy, 22, American hip hop dancer, injuries sustained from a fall.
Bud Thackery, 87, American cinematographer.
Zaim Topčić, 70, Yugoslav novelist.
Wilhelm Vorwerg, 90, German actor and art director.

16
Tomás Blanco, 79, Spanish actor.
Mogens Fog, 86, Danish politician.
Mikhail Matusovsky, 74, Soviet poet.
Miguel Muñoz, 68, Spanish footballer, internal bleeding.
Valentin Pikul, 62, Soviet novelist, heart attack.
Sidney Torch, 82, British musician, suicide by drug overdose.

17
Bernard Cowan, 68, Canadian actor and television producer.
Lidiya Ginzburg, 88, Soviet literary critic.
Guglielmo Giovannini, 64, Italian footballer.
Wilf Grant, 69, English footballer.
Edward A. Murphy, Jr., 72, American aerospace engineer, namesake of Murphy's law.

18
Gerry Boulet, 44, Canadian singer, cancer.
Yves Chaland, 33, French cartoonist, traffic collision.
André Chastel, 77, French art historian.
Georges Dargaud, 79, French publisher.
Roy Fagan, 84, Australian politician.
Karl Menninger, 96, American psychiatrist, abdominal cancer.
Yun Posun, 92, South Korean politician, president (1960–1962), diabetes.
Johnny Wayne, 72, Canadian comedian, brain cancer.
Štefan Čambal, 81, Czechoslovak football player.

19
Egil Aarvik, 77, Norwegian politician.
Helmut Becker, 63, German viticulturist.
Georgi Burkov, 57, Soviet actor, thrombosis.
Daniel du Janerand, 71, French painter, muralist, and book illustrator.
Gusman Kosanov, 55, Soviet Olympic sprinter (1960, 1964), suicide.
Eddie Quillan, 83, American actor, cancer.

20
Auguste Denise, 84, Ivorian politician and Head of state.
Sergei Parajanov, 66, Soviet filmmaker, cancer.
Klara Sierońska-Kostrzewa, 76, Polish Olympic gymnast (1936).
Bruno Splieth, 73, German sailor.

21
Heitor Canalli, 80, Brazilian football player.
Sacha Pitoëff, 70, Swiss actor.
Stanley Shapiro, 65, American screenwriter.
P. R. Shyamala, 59, Indian novelist.
Joe Turner, 82, American pianist, heart attack.
Rich Vogler, 39, American racing driver, racing collision.

22
Ray Mawby, 68, British politician.
Preben Neergaard, 70, Danish actor.
Manuel Puig, 57, Argentine novelist, heart attack.
Eduard Streltsov, 53, Soviet footballer, laryngeal cancer.

23
Otto Ambros, 89, German chemist and war criminal during World War II.
Georges Flamant, 86, French film actor.
Pierre Gandon, 91, French illustrator and engraver.
James D. Hart, 79, American literary scholar, brain cancer.
Maxwell Newton, 61, Australian publisher.
Bert Sommer, 41, American singer and actor, respiratory illness.
Kenjiro Takayanagi, 91, Japanese engineer and television pioneer, pneumonia.

24
Michel Beaune, 56, French actor, cancer.
Alan John Clarke, 54, English filmmaker, lung cancer.
Coen Dillen, 63, Dutch football player, heart attack.
Pasquale Fornara, 65, Italian racing cyclist.
Freddie Tavares, 77, American designer, engineer, and musician.
Arno Arthur Wachmann, 88, German astronomer.
Andy Woehr, 94, American baseball player.

25
Jean Fourastié, 83, French civil servant, economist, and intellectual.
Winefreda Geonzon, 48, Filipino lawyer, cancer.
Sam Grainger, 60, American comic book artist (Marvel Comics).
Kashim Ibrahim, 80, Nigerian politician.
Alfredo Pián, 77, Argentine racing driver.
S. A. Rahman, 87, Pakistani judge.
Paul Shannon, 80, American radio and television announcer, brain cancer.
Kuzman Sotirović, 81, Yugoslav footballer.

26
Leo Duyndam, 42, Dutch road bicycle racer, heart attack.
Brent Mydland, 37, American keyboardist (The Grateful Dead), drug overdose.
Albert Rose, 80, American physicist, lung cancer.
Giorgio Scarlatti, 68, Italian racing driver.
John Sylvester, 85-86, American naval admiral.

27
Elizabeth Allan, 80, English actress.
Ernest Archer, 80, British art director.
Bobby Day, 60, American singer ("Rockin' Robin"), prostate cancer.
Jimmy De Sana, 40, American artist, AIDS.
Ed Emshwiller, 65, American visual artist, cancer.
Maxine Gates, 73, American actress, respiratory failure.

28
Red Barrett, 75, American baseball player.
Maurice Braddell, 89, English actor and author.
Jill Esmond, 82, English actress.
Lancelot Layne, Trinidad and Tobago musician.

29
Georges Conchon, 65, French writer.
Herbert O. Fisher, 81, American aviation executive, heart failure.
Bruno Kreisky, 79, Austrian politician, chancellor (1970–1983), heart failure.
Cai Qiao, 92, Chinese physiologist and physician.
Arthur Samuel, 88, American computer scientist.

30
Victor Cavendish-Bentinck, 9th Duke of Portland, 93, British diplomat.
Launcelot Fleming, 83, British Anglican prelate.
Ian Gow, 53, British politician, car bombing.
Gustaf Jonsson, 87, Swedish skier.
Karl Weber, 74, American actor, heart failure.

31
Lowell Davidson, 48, American pianist, tuberculosis.
Nicolae Giosan, 68, Romanian agricultural engineer and politician.
Albert Leduc, 87, Canadian ice hockey player.
Wilhelm Nowack, 92, German economist and politician.
Lovro Radonjić, 62, Yugoslav water polo player and Olympic medalist.
Fernando Sancho, 74, Spanish actor, pancreatic cancer.
Ludger Westrick, 95, German politician.

References 

1990-07
 07